San Giovanni in Galdo is a comune (municipality) in the Province of Campobasso in the Italian region of Molise, located about  east of Campobasso.

San Giovanni in Galdo borders the following municipalities: Campobasso, Campodipietra, Campolieto, Matrice, Monacilioni, Toro.
San Giovanni in Galdo is home to many families that emigrated to America in the early 1900s. Families with the surnames of DiCesare,Trotta, DeMaioribus, Marino, Santone and Di'Orio.

Main sights
San Giovanni in Galdo is the site of a Samnitic sanctuary atop Colle Rimontato (709 meters a.s.l.). Excavated between 1974 and 1976, the sanctuary took the form of a frontal Italic podium temple surrounded by a portico. The ritual activity at the sanctuary was confine to a limited area, likely indicating that the temple served a discrete, local population.

References

Cities and towns in Molise